This is a list of destinations that Cebu Pacific and its regional subsidiary Cebgo have served , consisting of destinations across Asia and Oceania.

Cebu Pacific

Notes

Cebgo

References

Lists of airline destinations
Destinations